This article lists the oldest buildings and structures in Metro Manila, the Philippines that were constructed before 1900. Majority of the oldest extant buildings in the capital region are religious buildings built during the Spanish Colonial period. Several buildings in the list have been reconstructed a few times with only a fraction of their original structures remaining. The buildings are sorted according to the year they were first built as inscribed on their historical markers installed by the National Historical Commission of the Philippines. The list excludes ruined buildings, monuments and road structures.

16th century

17th century

18th century

19th century

See also
 List of Cultural Properties of the Philippines in Metro Manila
 List of historical markers of the Philippines in Metro Manila
 List of Roman Catholic churches in Metro Manila

References

Oldest buildings and structures
Metro Manila
Buildings and structures
Buildings and structures
Oldest buildings in Metro Manila